Jason Anthony MacDonald (born June 3, 1975) is a Canadian former mixed martial artist. A professional from 1999 until 2013, he is perhaps best remembered for his two stints in the UFC, but also fought for King of the Cage, and the Maximum Fighting Championship. Known for his grappling skills, 19 of his 25 career wins came by way of submission.

Mixed martial arts career

Early career
MacDonald began his career in local Canadian promotions, including the MFC, racking up a 16-7 professional record which included wins over UFC veterans Joe Doerksen, Gideon Ray, and Bill Mahood.

Ultimate Fighting Championship
MacDonald made his UFC debut on October 10, 2006, at Ortiz vs. Shamrock 3: The Final Chapter against the favored The Ultimate Fighter 3 finalist Ed Herman. In an upset, MacDonald won the bout via triangle choke in the first round. MacDonald followed up the performance with a win over The Ultimate Fighter 1 veteran Chris Leben via modified guillotine choke in the second round. Both victories earned Submission of the Night honors.

MacDonald lost in competition at UFC 68 with a match-up against Rich Franklin in his first appearance since losing the UFC Middleweight Championship to Anderson Silva. Franklin mounted MacDonald in the final seconds of round two, causing enough injury to MacDonald's left eye area that his corner advised him to throw in the towel, and Franklin was declared the winner.

At UFC 72, MacDonald rebounded from his loss to Franklin with a second-round TKO victory over Rory Singer. This marked his third victory over The Ultimate Fighter veterans.

At UFC 77, MacDonald faced Yushin Okami, who was coming off a loss to Franklin in a title contention elimination bout. MacDonald lost the fight via unanimous decision (30-27, 30-27, 30-27).

MacDonald fell back from the defeat at UFC 83, defeating Joe Doerksen via TKO (elbows) in the second round and earning a $75,000 bonus for Knockout of the Night in the process. A small controversy erupted after MacDonald landed two hammerfists after it appeared the fight had been stopped. In an interview the day after the fight, MacDonald explained that the referee had instructed him to continue fighting and had even apologized to him for his error in judgment.

At UFC 87, MacDonald faced Brazilian Demian Maia. The fight took place almost completely on the ground, with MacDonald escaping numerous submission attempts. Ultimately in the third round, Maia locked in a rear-naked choke for the victory.

Only a month later, MacDonald went on to fight as a replacement for Jason Day at UFC 88. He won against Jason Lambert at 1:20 of round two by rear-naked choke, earning his third Submission of the Night bonus.

MacDonald followed up with a bout at The Ultimate Fighter: Team Nogueira vs Team Mir Finale against Wilson Gouveia. MacDonald lost the fight via submission due to elbows after being dropped with a glancing left jab by Gouveia and pounded on for the stoppage.

At UFC 97, MacDonald suffered a first-round TKO loss to Nate Quarry due to elbows from a mounted position.

Despite earlier suggestions from Dana White that MacDonald's position in the UFC roster was safe despite his recent lack of success, the UFC released MacDonald several weeks later. Matchmaker Joe Silva commented that the door would be left open for MacDonald to return should he earn a few more victories in smaller promotions.

Post-UFC Release
At the MFC 21 event on May 15, 2009, MacDonald announced that he was returning to the Canadian promotion Maximum Fighting Championship. He fought Travis Lutter in the main event of MFC 22 on October 2, 2009, losing a unanimous decision.

Jason MacDonald faced TUF 3 competitor and fellow UFC veteran Solomon Hutcherson at MFC 23 defeating him by split decision giving MacDonald his fifth victory over a TUF competitor.

On March 20, 2010, MacDonald replaced Denis Kang in the main event of W1 Bad Blood. He defeated Vernon White in the 3rd round via triangle choke.

On April 23, 2010, MacDonald defeated Matt Horwich via unanimous decision in the main event of the very first Let's Get It On MMA tournament event.

Return to the UFC
MacDonald returned to the UFC and faced up and coming wrestler John Salter on May 8, 2010, at UFC 113, replacing an injured Nick Catone. After 2:42 of the first round, MacDonald's leg broke during a takedown attempt by Salter and the fight was stopped, declaring Salter the winner by TKO due to injury.

MacDonald was scheduled to face Rafael Natal on December 11, 2010, at UFC 124, but pulled out of the fight after suffering an injury in training.

Nearly a year after his last bout, MacDonald fought and submitted Ryan Jensen via first-round triangle choke at UFC 129 on April 30, 2011.

MacDonald faced Alan Belcher on September 17, 2011 at UFC Fight Night 25, losing via verbal submission due to strikes in the first round.

MacDonald faced Tom Lawlor on May 15, 2012 at UFC on Fuel TV: Korean Zombie vs. Poirier.  He lost the fight via KO in the first round. On February 28, 2013, MacDonald announced his retirement from MMA, leaving his UFC record standing at 6-8.

MMA Business
MacDonald owns and runs his own gym, Pure Fitness & MMA, located in Red Deer, Alberta, Canada. He also runs his own fight promotion called Pure Fighting Championship.
He manages a number of Canadian professional MMA fighters, including Ryan Machan, Evan Sanguin, George Belanger and Derek Clark.

Personal life
MacDonald and his wife Kelly have four children, sons Tristin and Keel and daughters Jett and True.

Jason is also a CrossFit Trainer, and works for CrossFit HQ co-teaching the CrossFit Level 1 Trainer Certification course.

Championships and accomplishments
Ultimate Fighting Championship
Knockout of the Night (One time) vs. Joe Doerksen 
Submission of the Night (Three times) vs. Chris Leben, Ed Herman, Jason Lambert 
Absolute Fighting Championships
AFC Light Heavyweight Championship (One time)

Mixed martial arts record

|-
| Loss
| align=center| 25–16
| Tom Lawlor
| KO (punch)
| UFC on Fuel TV: Korean Zombie vs. Poirier
| 
| align=center| 1
| align=center| 0:50
| Fairfax, Virginia, United States
| 
|-
| Loss
| align=center| 25–15
| Alan Belcher
| Submission (punches)
| UFC Fight Night: Shields vs. Ellenberger
| 
| align=center| 1
| align=center| 3:48
| New Orleans, Louisiana, United States
| 
|-
| Win
| align=center| 25–14
| Ryan Jensen
| Submission (triangle choke)
| UFC 129
| 
| align=center| 1
| align=center| 1:37
| Toronto, Ontario, Canada
| 
|-
| Loss
| align=center| 24–14
| John Salter
| TKO (leg injury)
| UFC 113
| 
| align=center| 1
| align=center| 2:42
| Montreal, Quebec, Canada
| 
|-
| Win
| align=center| 24–13
| Matt Horwich
| Decision (unanimous)
| LGIO MMA 1: MacDonald vs Horwich
| 
| align=center| 3
| align=center| 5:00
| Edmonton, Alberta, Canada
| 
|-
| Win
| align=center| 23–13
| Vernon White
| Submission (triangle choke)
| W-1 MMA 4: Bad Blood 
| 
| align=center| 3
| align=center| 2:12
| Montreal, Quebec, Canada
| 
|-
| Win
| align=center| 22–13
| Solomon Hutcherson
| Decision (split)
| MFC 23
| 
| align=center| 3
| align=center| 5:00
| Edmonton, Alberta, Canada
| 
|-
| Loss
| align=center| 21–13
| Travis Lutter
| Decision (unanimous)
| MFC 22
| 
| align=center| 3
| align=center| 5:00
| Edmonton, Alberta, Canada
| 
|-
| Loss
| align=center| 21–12
| Nate Quarry
| TKO (elbows)
| UFC 97
| 
| align=center| 1
| align=center| 2:27
| Montreal, Quebec, Canada
| 
|-
| Loss
| align=center| 21–11
| Wilson Gouveia
| Submission (elbows)
| The Ultimate Fighter: Team Nogueira vs Team Mir Finale
| 
| align=center| 1
| align=center| 2:18
| Las Vegas, Nevada, United States
| 
|-
| Win
| align=center| 21–10
| Jason Lambert
| Submission (rear-naked choke)
| UFC 88
| 
| align=center| 2
| align=center| 1:20
| Atlanta, Georgia, United States
| Submission of the Night.
|-
| Loss
| align=center| 20–10
| Demian Maia
| Submission (rear-naked choke)
| UFC 87
| 
| align=center| 3
| align=center| 2:44
| Minneapolis, Minnesota, United States
| 
|-
| Win
| align=center| 20–9
| Joe Doerksen
| TKO (elbows)
| UFC 83
| 
| align=center| 2
| align=center| 0:54
| Montreal, Quebec, Canada
| <small>Knockout of the Night
|-
| Loss
| align=center| 19–9
| Yushin Okami
| Decision (unanimous)
| UFC 77
| 
| align=center| 3
| align=center| 5:00
| Cincinnati, Ohio, United States
| 
|-
| Win
| align=center| 19–8
| Rory Singer
| TKO (punches and elbows)
| UFC 72
| 
| align=center| 2
| align=center| 3:18
| Belfast, Northern Ireland
| 
|-
| Loss
| align=center| 18–8
| Rich Franklin
| TKO (corner stoppage)
| UFC 68
| 
| align=center| 2
| align=center| 5:00
| Columbus, Ohio, United States
| 
|-
| Win
| align=center| 18–7
| Chris Leben
| Submission (guillotine choke)
| UFC 66: Liddell vs. Ortiz
| 
| align=center| 2
| align=center| 4:03
| Las Vegas, Nevada, United States
| Submission of the Night.
|-
| Win
| align=center| 17–7
| Ed Herman
| Submission (triangle choke)
| Ortiz vs. Shamrock 3: The Final Chapter
| 
| align=center| 1
| align=center| 2:43
| Hollywood, Florida, United States
| Submission of the Night.
|-
| Win
| align=center| 16–7
| Neil Berry
| Submission (rear-naked choke)
| MFC 10: Unfinished Business
| 
| align=center| 1
| align=center| 1:39
| Edmonton, Alberta, Canada
| 
|-
| Win
| align=center| 15–7
| Fritz Paul
| Technical Submission (kimura)
| ECC 3: East Coast Warriors
| 
| align=center| 1
| align=center| 2:14
| Halifax, Nova Scotia, Canada
| 
|-
| Win
| align=center| 14–7
| Jerry Spiegel
| TKO (punches)
| ECC 2: Collision Course
| 
| align=center| 2
| align=center| 0:33
| Moncton, New Brunswick, Canada
| 
|-
| Win
| align=center| 13–7
| Gideon Ray
| Decision (unanimous)
| Extreme Cage Combat 1
| 
| align=center| 3
| align=center| 5:00
| Halifax, Nova Scotia, Canada
| 
|-
| Loss
| align=center| 12–7
| Patrick Cote
| Submission (rear-naked choke)
| MFC 9: No Excuses
| 
| align=center| 5
| align=center| 1:55
| Edmonton, Alberta, Canada
| 
|-
| Loss
| align=center| 12–6
| Kalib Starnes
| TKO (punches)
| National Fighting Challenge 5
| 
| align=center| 1
| align=center| 4:37
| North Vancouver, British Columbia, Canada
| 
|-
| Win
| align=center| 12–5
| Joe Doerksen
| Submission (rear-naked choke)
| Ultimate Cage Wars 3
| 
| align=center| 4
| align=center| 4:37
| Winnipeg, Manitoba, Canada
| 
|-
| Win
| align=center| 11–5
| Chris Fontaine
| Submission (rear naked choke)
| MFC 8: Resurrection
| 
| align=center| 2
| align=center| 2:12
| Edmonton, Alberta, Canada
| 
|-
| Loss
| align=center| 10–5
| Shonie Carter
| Decision (unanimous)
| TKO 21: Collision
| 
| align=center| 3
| align=center| 5:00
| Montreal, Quebec, Canada
| 
|-
| Loss
| align=center| 10–4
| Marvin Eastman
| Decision (unanimous)
| WEF: Sin City
| 
| align=center| 3
| align=center| 5:00
| Las Vegas, Nevada, United States
| 
|-
| Loss
| align=center| 10–3
| Jason Brilz
| Decision (split)
| KOTC:: Edmonton
| 
| align=center| 2
| align=center| 5:00
| Edmonton, Alberta, Canada
| 
|-
| Loss
| align=center| 10–2
| Matt Horwich
| Submission (armbar)
| Extreme Fighting Challenge 3
| 
| align=center| 1
| align=center| N/A
| Prince George, British Columbia, Canada
| 
|-
| Win
| align=center| 10–1
| Antony Rea
| Submission (scarf hold armlock)
| Absolute Fighting Championships 8
| 
| align=center| 1
| align=center| 2:22
| Fort Lauderdale, Florida, United States
| 
|-
| Win
| align=center| 9–1
| Ulysses Castro
| Submission (rear-naked choke)
| Adrenaline Fighting Championships 1
| 
| align=center| 2
| align=center| 2:49
| Langley, British Columbia, Canada
| 
|-
| Loss
| align=center| 8–1
| Bill Mahood
| TKO (punches)
| MFC 7: Undisputed
| 
| align=center| 2
| align=center| 3:02
| Slave Lake, Alberta, Canada
| 
|-
| Win
| align=center| 8–0
| Jeromie Sills
| Submission (triangle choke)
| MFC 6: Road To Gold
| 
| align=center| 1
| align=center| 1:54
| Lethbridge, Alberta, Canada
| 
|-
| Win
| align=center| 7–0
| Yan Pellerin
| Submission (heel hook)
| MFC: Unplugged
| 
| align=center| 1
| align=center| N/A
| Edmonton, Alberta, Canada
| 
|-
| Win
| align=center| 6–0
| Cameron Brown
| Submission (rear-naked choke)
| MFC 5: Sweet Redemption
| 
| align=center| 2
| align=center| 4:09
| Edmonton, Alberta, Canada
| 
|-
| Win
| align=center| 5–0
| Shannon Ritch
| Submission (rear-naked choke)
| MFC 4: New Groundz
| 
| align=center| 1
| align=center| 2:45
| Calgary, Alberta, Canada
| 
|-
| Win
| align=center| 4–0
| Chris Peak
| Submission (keylock)
| MFC 3: Canadian Pride
| 
| align=center| 1
| align=center| 1:54
| Grande Prairie, Alberta, Canada
| 
|-
| Win
| align=center| 3–0
| Bill Mahood
| Technical Submission (guillotine choke)
| MFC 2: Rumble at the Jungle
| 
| align=center| 3
| align=center| 1:17
| Edmonton, Alberta, Canada
| 
|-
| Win
| align=center| 2–0
| Shane Biever
| Submission (choke)
| Northern Lights Out
| 
| align=center| 1
| align=center| N/A
| Alberta, Canada
| 
|-
| Win
| align=center| 1–0
| Ken Manderson
| Submission (armbar)
| Punch and Crunch
| 
| align=center| 1
| align=center| N/A
| Calgary, Alberta, Canada
|

References

External links

Jason MacDonald Blog
Official UFC Profile

1975 births
Canadian male mixed martial artists
Canadian people of Scottish descent
Canadian practitioners of Brazilian jiu-jitsu
People awarded a black belt in Brazilian jiu-jitsu
Canadian prison officers
Living people
Middleweight mixed martial artists
People from New Glasgow, Nova Scotia
Sportspeople from Nova Scotia
Ultimate Fighting Championship male fighters